Goose Prairie may refer to:

 Goose Prairie Township, Clay County, Minnesota
 Goose Prairie, Washington, unincorporated community in Yakima County, Washington